Deimantas Bička (born 13 February 1972) is a retired Lithuanian football midfielder. In 2008, he was proclaimed the best player of the A Lyga. He retired from professional football on 13 November 2010.

Bička made two appearances for the Lithuania national football team during 1993.

References

External links

Lithuania international footballers
Lithuanian footballers
A Lyga players
FK Panerys Vilnius players
FK Ventspils players
FK Ekranas players
FC Sheriff Tiraspol players
1972 births
Living people
Expatriate footballers in Moldova
FK Kareda Kaunas players
Association football midfielders